Frederick P. Bellinger (March 15, 1792 – February 13, 1876) was an American farmer and politician from New York.

Life
He was the son of Capt. Peter F. Bellinger (1759–1815) and Elizabeth (Harter) Bellinger (1764–1823). He married Mary Barbara Weaver (1798–1874), and they had six children.

He was a member of the New York State Assembly in 1827 and 1830 (Herkimer Co.); and in 1849 (Herkimer Co., 1st D.).

He was a member of the New York State Senate (16th D.) in 1856 and 1857.

He was buried at the Oak Hill Cemetery in Herkimer, New York.

Sources
The New York Civil List compiled by Franklin Benjamin Hough (pages 137f, 205, 209, 236 and 258; Weed, Parsons and Co., 1858)
Pen and Ink Portraits of the Senators, Assemblymen, and State Officers of New York by G. W. Bungay (1857; pg. 10)
Early Families of Herkimer County (pg. 30)

External links

1792 births
1876 deaths
Republican Party New York (state) state senators
People from Herkimer County, New York
New York (state) Jacksonians
19th-century American politicians
New York (state) Free Soilers